Robert Mark "Robbie" James (23 March 1957 – 18 February 1998) was a Welsh international footballer who played for many teams including Swansea City, Stoke City and Queens Park Rangers. He represented his country on 47 occasions over a period of ten years, scoring a total of seven goals.

He was a talented utility player who contributed greatly to Swansea City's rise from the Fourth Division to the First Division between 1978 and 1981, and helped them finish sixth in their first top division campaign. He played a total of 783 English league games between 1973 and 1994, scoring 134 goals. His league appearance tally is one of the highest of any player in the history of English football.

Career 
James was born in Gorseinon and began his career with local side Swansea City. He made his debut at the end of the 1972–73 season which ended with Swansea being relegated to the Fourth Division. They slowly recovered and James 16 goals in 1976–77 and 17 in 1977–78 helping the Swans gain promotion back to the Football League Third Division. He then scored a career best of 21 in 1978–79 as Swansea gained back to back promotions. After two seasons in the Second Division they completed a remarkable rise gaining promotion to the First Division for the first time in the club's history. James took to the top flight well scoring 14 goals in 46 appearances as Swansea finished in sixth position. However the following season saw Swansea relegated back to the Second Division and James joined Stoke City.

He played in 46 matches for Stoke in 1983–84 scoring seven goals but with the team struggling in 1984–85 he was sold to Queens Park Rangers £100,000. He spent three seasons at Loftus Road, helping the Hoops preserve their First Division status and reach the 1986 Football League Cup Final, where they were beaten 3–0 by Oxford United. At the end of the 1986–87 season, he joined Leicester City who had just been relegated to the Second Division.

After a season with Leicester he moved back to Swansea City, and later played for Bradford City and Cardiff City. With Cardiff, he helped them to win the Third Division in 1992–93, his last season in the English Football League after 20 years. After his time with Cardiff he moved into Non-League football with Merthyr Tydfil. He became player-manager of Llaneli in 1996, but collapsed and died while playing for them against Porthcawl on 18 February 1998. He was 40 years old.

Legacy 
In 2007, a bust of James was unveiled outside Swansea's Liberty Stadium. The bust, located next to the stadium's ticket office, was made possible by fans raising nearly £7,000 in memory of the midfielder, who played almost 400 games for the club.

On 22 September 2012, the first 20 names were inducted into the 'Robbie James Wall of Fame', a hall of fame commemorating notable former Swansea players and managers. The Wall of Fame, located beneath the bust of James at the Liberty Stadium, will eventually consist of a total of 100 plaques, unveiled over a period of 5 years.

Career statistics

Club 
Source:

A.  The "Other" column constitutes appearances and goals in the Full Members Cup, Football League play-offs, Football League Trophy and UEFA Cup Winners' Cup.

International 
Source:

Honours 

 Swansea City
 Football League Fourth Division third-place promotion: 1977–78
 Football League Third Division third-place promotion: 1978–79
 Football League Second Division third-place promotion: 1980–81
 Football League Fourth Division play-off winner: 1987–88

 Queens Park Rangers
 Football League Cup runner-up: 1986

 Cardiff City
 Football League Third Division champions: 1992–93

See also 
 List of men's footballers with the most official appearances

References

External links 
 

1957 births
1998 deaths
Footballers from Swansea
Swansea City A.F.C. players
Stoke City F.C. players
Queens Park Rangers F.C. players
Leicester City F.C. players
Bradford City A.F.C. players
Cardiff City F.C. players
Merthyr Tydfil F.C. players
Barry Town United F.C. players
Llanelli Town A.F.C. players
Wales international footballers
Welsh footballers
Association football midfielders
Cymru Premier managers
English Football League players
Llanelli Town A.F.C. managers
Association football players who died while playing
Welsh football managers
Sport deaths in Wales